Romina Tejerina (born 1983 in San Pedro, Jujuy Province) is an Argentine woman who was sentenced on June 10, 2005 to 14 years in prison for the murder of her newborn baby daughter. The baby was allegedly a product of a sexual abuse that Tejerina suffered but was too afraid to reveal. 

On February 23, 2003, Tejerina gave birth in her home to a baby girl. With the help of her sister, she cut the baby's umbilical cord and placed her in a small box. A few minutes later, Tejerina attacked the baby with a sewing needle. The baby died two days later in the hospital and Tejerina was arrested.

Tejerina's alleged sexual abuse was never proved. Her claims of being abused came to light well after she was charged with murder. Her alleged abuser was found not guilty, as it was claimed that Tejerina had consensual intercourse with him. As a result, there were no elements to support her defense about her mental condition at the time of the murder. She was freed on 24 June 2012, after serving half of her 14 year sentence.

References

External links 
 Supreme Court ruling 

1983 births
Argentine female murderers
Argentine murderers of children
Argentine people convicted of murder
Filicides
Living people
National University of Tucumán alumni
People convicted of murder by Argentina
People from Jujuy Province